This is a list of museums in Malaysia.

Johor
 Bugis Museum
 Figure Museum
 Johor Bahru Chinese Heritage Museum
 Kite Museum
 Kota Johor Lama Museum
 Kota Tinggi Museum
 Pineapple Museum
 Tanjung Balau Fishermen Museum

Kedah
 Paddy Museum

Kelantan
 Istana Batu Royal Museum
 Museum of Royal Traditions and Customs
 Kelantan Islamic Museum
 Kelantan Museum

Kuala Lumpur
 Islamic Arts Museum Malaysia
 Maybank Numismatic Museum
 National History Museum
 National Museum
 National Textile Museum
 Petrosains
 Royal Malaysian Police Museum
 Royal Museum
 Petronas Gallery

Labuan
 Chimney Museum
 Labuan Maritime Museum
 Labuan Museum

Malacca
 Malacca Museum Corporation (PERZIM)
 Aborigines Museum
 Agricultural Museum
 Beauty Museum
 Chitty Museum
 Democratic Government Museum
 Education Museum
 Governor's Museum
 History and Ethnography Museum
 Kite Museum
 Melaka Al-Quran Museum
 Malacca Bee Gallery
 Melaka Forestry Museum
 Melaka Islamic Museum
 Melaka Literature Museum
 Melaka Stamp Museum
 Melaka Sultanate Palace Museum
 Malay and Islamic World Museum
 Malaysia Architecture Museum
 Malaysia Prison Museum
 Malaysia Youth Museum
 Maritime Museum
 People's Museum
 Royal Malaysian Customs Department Museum
 Royal Malaysian Navy Museum
 Submarine Museum

 Baba Nyonya Heritage Museum
 Cheng Ho Cultural Museum
 Melaka UMNO Museum
 Straits Chinese Jewellery Museum
 Toy Museum

Negeri Sembilan
 Custom Museum
 Lukut Fort and Museum
 Seri Menanti Royal Museum

Pahang
 Sultan Abu Bakar Museum
 Time Tunnel Museum

Penang
 Batik Painting Museum Penang
 Camera Museum
 Penang Museum and Art Gallery
 Sun Yat-sen Museum Penang

Perak
 Beruas Museum
 Darul Ridzuan Museum
 Geological Museum (Malaysia)
 Han Chin Pet Soo, Hakka Tin Mining Museum
 Kota Ngah Ibrahim
 Palong Tin Museum
 Perak Royal Museum
 Perak State Museum
 Sitiawan Settlement Museum

Perlis
 Kota Kayang Museum

Sabah
 Agnes Keith House
 Keningau Heritage Museum
 Mat Sator Museum
 Pogunon Community Museum
 Sabah Islamic Civilisation Museum
 Sabah Museum
 Sandakan Heritage Museum
 Tun Sakaran Museum

Sarawak
 Lau King Howe Hospital Memorial Museum
 Islamic Heritage Museum
 Kuching Cat Museum
 Petroleum Museum
 Sarawak State Museum
 Textile Museum Sarawak
 Sibu Heritage Centre
 Borneo Cultures Museum

Selangor
 Orang Asli Museum
 Petaling Jaya Museum
 Sultan Alam Shah Museum

Terengganu

 Terengganu State Museum

See also

 List of museums
 Tourism in Malaysia
 List of tourist attractions in Malaysia
 Culture of Malaysia

External links
 

Museums

Malaysia
Museums
Museums
Malaysia